Thomas Browning Burtt (22 January 1915 – 24 May 1988) was a New Zealand cricketer who played in ten Tests from 1947 to 1953.

Domestic career
In his last first-class match, for Canterbury against the MCC in 1954–55, he hit 24 off one over from Johnny Wardle.

In first-class cricket, he played 84 games, mostly for Canterbury, between 1943 and 1955, taking 408 wickets at 22.19. His brother Noel also played for Canterbury, as did his nephew Wayne Burtt.

In 1937 and 1938 he also represented New Zealand at hockey.

Trivia
His 128 wickets taken on the 1949 tour of England is a record for New Zealand. In Wisden, Charles Bray said of him, "The bulk of the bowling fell on the tubby, cheerful T.B. Burtt, slow left-arm, immaculate length, good flight, who attacked the off-stump so accurately that he constantly tied down the opposing batsmen."

International career
He played ten consecutive Tests over six years, bowling long spells, taking wickets, and scoring useful runs in the tail, until he was dropped after the First Test against South Africa in 1952–53. According to Richard Boock in his biography of Bert Sutcliffe, Burtt was one of several players at the time who "paid the ultimate price for being overweight". He was overlooked for the next season's tour of South Africa, the inexperienced spinners Eric Dempster, Matt Poore and Bill Bell going instead, and did not play another Test.

References

External links

1915 births
1988 deaths
New Zealand Test cricketers
New Zealand cricketers
Canterbury cricketers
South Island cricketers
New Zealand male field hockey players